This list of people from Pensacola, Florida includes people who were born or lived there for a nontrivial amount of time. Note that Pensacola natives are referred to as Pensacolans/Pensacolians.

Politics, law, and military

 Reubin O'Donovan Askew - Politician. 37th governor of Florida from 1971 to 1979.
 Samuel Gibbs French (1818-1910) - American military officer.
 Harry B. Harris Jr. - American diplomat and former U.S. Navy officer.
 Daniel "Chappie" James Jr. - First African American to reach the rank of four-star general in the United States Armed Forces.
 Fred Levin - American lawyer.
 Stephen Mallory (1812–1873) - American politician.
 Carol McCain - American Director of the White House Visitors Office during the Reagan administration.
 Charles H. Percy
 Joe Scarborough
 George O. Van Orden
 Craig Waters
 Virginia Bass Wetherell
 Vince Whibbs
 Charles R. Wilson
 Emmett Wilson
 Alexander Butterfield - deputy assistant to President Richard Nixon from 1969 to 1973

Religion

 Paula Ackerman
 Chuck Baldwin
 Paul Jennings Hill
 Martin Holley
 Kent Hovind
 Peter Ruckman
 Katharine Jefferts Schori

Sports

 Doug Baldwin
 Jay Bell
 Derrick Brooks
 Bryce Callahan
 Adron Chambers
 Tom Cheek
 Josh Donaldson
 Joe Durant
 Dave Elder
 Reggie Evans
 Trinity Fatu
 Solofa Fatu Jr
 Cortland Finnegan
 Travis Fryman
 Derrick Gainer
 Graham Gano
 Justin Gatlin
 Nick Green
 Tyronne Green
 Michael Hayes
 Kim Helton
 Horace Jones
 Roy Jones Jr.
 Alec Kessler
 Jonathan Little
 Johanna Long
 Max Macon
 Jason McKie
 Alfred Morris
 Winchester Osgood
 Jerry Pate
 Loucheiz Purifoy
 Damarious Randall
 Roman Reigns
 Trent Richardson
 Fred Robbins
 Mitchell Robinson
 Shorty Rollins
 Addison Russell
 Darrell Russell
 Buck Showalter
 Josh Sitton
 Heath Slocum
 Emmitt Smith
 Michelle Snow
 Ron Stallworth
 Omar Stoutmire
 Don Sutton
 Lawrence Tynes
 Mark Whiten

Music, media, and art

 Christopher Andersen
 Alfons Bach
 Ashley Brown
 Larry Butler
 Austin Carlile
 Joe Dallesandro
 Nancy Dussault
 Michael Edwards
 Mark Gormley
 Robert Graysmith
 Gigi Gryce, jazz composer and musician
 Bill Kurtis
 Matt Maiellaro 
 Rob and Amber Mariano
 Gwen McCrae
 Mike McCready
 Katy Mixon
 Joshua Moon
 Dot Moore
 Joan Perry
 Bob Rasmussen
 John Schwab
 Peggy Scott-Adams
 This Bike Is a Pipe Bomb
 Aaron Tippin
 Don Shirley, Jazz and Classical pianist, subject of the 2018 film, Green Book

Other

John David Roy Atchison (1954–2007), Assistant US Attorney and children's sports coach, committed suicide in prison after being charged with soliciting sex from a 5-year-old girl

References

 
Pensacola, Florida
Pensacola